

The Engineering Division TW-1 was an American two-seat training biplane designed by the United States Army Engineering Division, only two were built and the type did not enter production.

Design and development

Two prototypes of the TW-1 were built powered by a  Liberty 6. The second aircraft was tested at McCook Field, (given the McCook designation P-200) and subsequently modified with a  Packard 1A-1237 engine but no others were built.

Specifications

See also

References

Notes

Bibliography

 

TW-01
1920s United States military trainer aircraft
Single-engined tractor aircraft
Biplanes
Aircraft first flown in 1920